This is the discography of rapper Juvenile. Juvenile has sold over 10 million albums worldwide.

Albums

Studio albums

Collaboration albums

Compilation albums

Mixtapes
2007: Rejuvenated-(bootleg)
2009: Uptown Nolia Boy
2009: Undefeated 
2012: Mardi Gras 
2012: Nino The Magnificent 
2012: Juvie Tuesday
2015: Mardi Gras 2

Singles

As lead artist

As featured artist

Other charted songs

Guest appearances

Music videos

See also 
 Cash Money Millionaires discography
 Hot Boys discography
 UTP discography

Notes

References

External links
 
 
 

Discographies of American artists
Hip hop discographies